Grigas is a surname. Notable people with the surname include:

Agnia Grigas (born 1979), American political scientist and author
Apolinaras Grigas (born 1945), Soviet rower
John Grigas (1920–2000), American football player
Rimantas Grigas (born 1962), Lithuanian basketball coach

See also
Griga